Associação Desportiva Ovarense commonly known as simply as Ovarense is a Portuguese sports club from the city of Ovar, Aveiro. The club was founded on 19 December 1921. It currently plays at the Estádio Marques da Silva which they have played in since 1954. The stadium also plays host to the club's reserve and youth teams. As a club it is well known for its basketball team who have won nineteen major trophies since their establishment in 1970. The club currently competes in the AF Aveiro Second Division following a seventh-place finish in the 2011–12 AF Aveiro Second Division season.

Ovarense was one of the founding members of the Aveiro Football Association along with Anadia, Beira-Mar, Bustelo, Clube dos Galitos, Espinho, Fogueirese, Paços Brandão, Sanjoanense, SC Oliveirense, Sociedade Recreio Artístico and UD Oliveirense. The association was founded on 22 September 1924. The club has played on various occasions in the Liga de Honra, Segunda Divisão and the Terceira Divisão. Their most recent Liga de Honra appearance came in the 2005–06 Liga de Honra season. Shortly after, serious financial problems led to the team's demotion to the fifth level of national football.

Honours

Segunda Divisão B: 2
1990–91, 1999–2000
Terceira Divisão: 1
1949–50

AF Aveiro Championship: 5
1930–31, 1932–33, 1934–35, 1935–36, 1938–39
AF Aveiro First Division: 4
1949–50, 1954–55, 1970–71, 1980–81

Notable former players

 António Sousa
 Carlos Marques
 Dito
 Eduardo Luís
 Gil
 Hélder Sousa
 Hugo Coelho
 Ivo Damas
 Jaime Mercês
 Jorge Humberto
 Jorge Silva
 José Chevela
 José Luís
 José Nunes
 José Pedro
 Luís Miguel
 Miguel Areias
 Paulo Teixeira
 Pedro Emanuel
 Pedro Mingote
 Pedro Pinheiro
 Rui Correia
 Rui Pataca
 Sérgio Leite
 Valdir
 Zé Gomes
 Klevis Dalipi
 Jaime Linares
 Marco Abreu
 Wilson
 Svetislav Perduv
 Edu
 Edu Sousa
 Leandro
 Leandro Netto
 Nei
 Caló
 Dário Furtado
 Mateus Lopes
 Emmanuel Duah
 Adilson
 Inzaghi Donígio
 Jojó
 Jovo Simanić

Managers

2001–02:  Pedro Miguel
until 2012: António Tavares

League and cup history

References

External links
 Official website 
 Club Profile at ForaDeJogo 
 Club Profile at ZeroZero

Football clubs in Portugal
Association football clubs established in 1921
1921 establishments in Portugal
Sport in Ovar
Liga Portugal 2 clubs